Mark Daniel Ronson (born 4 September 1975) is an English DJ, songwriter, record producer, and record executive. He is best known for his collaborations with artists such as Amy Winehouse, Lady Gaga, Adele, Lily Allen, Duran Duran, Robbie Williams, Miley Cyrus, Queens of the Stone Age, and Bruno Mars. He has received seven Grammy Awards, including Producer of the Year for Winehouse's album Back to Black and two for Record of the Year singles "Rehab" and "Uptown Funk". He received an Academy Award, a Golden Globe Award and a Grammy Award for co-writing the song "Shallow" (performed by Lady Gaga and Bradley Cooper) for the film A Star Is Born (2018).

Ronson was born in London and raised in New York City. His stepfather is Foreigner guitarist Mick Jones, which contributed to a childhood surrounded by music. While attending New York University, Ronson became a popular DJ in the hip-hop scene. His debut album Here Comes the Fuzz failed to have an effect on the charts. In 2006, he received acclaim for producing albums for Lily Allen, Christina Aguilera, and Amy Winehouse. In 2007, Ronson released his second album, Version. The album reached number two in the UK and included three top ten singles and earned him the Brit Award for British Male Solo Artist. He subsequently released his third studio album, Record Collection, peaking at number two in the UK.

In 2014, Ronson released his single "Uptown Funk" featuring vocals from Bruno Mars. The single spent 14 consecutive weeks at number one on the U.S. Billboard Hot 100, seven non-consecutive weeks at number one on the UK Singles Chart and became one of the best-selling singles of all-time. His fourth studio album, Uptown Special, became his most successful album to date. In 2018, he founded his own label, Zelig Records (an imprint of Columbia Records), and formed the duo Silk City with fellow producer Diplo, they released their debut single "Electricity" featuring Dua Lipa for which he received the Grammy Award for Best Dance Recording.

In 2015, he became a patron of the Amy Winehouse Foundation, which helps disadvantaged youth through music. He has also worked with the End the Silence campaign to raise money and awareness for the Hope and Homes for Children charity and served as an artist mentor at Turnaround Arts, a national program of the John F. Kennedy Center for the Performing Arts, which helped low-performing schools through arts education.

Early life
Mark Daniel Ronson was born in Notting Hill, London, England, to Laurence Ronson, a then music manager and publisher, now real estate developer, and Ann Dexter-Jones (née Dexter), a writer, jewelry designer, and socialite. His Ashkenazi Jewish ancestors emigrated from Austria, Lithuania, and Russia. He was brought up in a Conservative Jewish household and celebrated his Bar Mitzvah.

After his parents' divorce, his mother married Foreigner guitarist Mick Jones. Jones wrote Foreigner's hit song "I Want to Know What Love Is" about his burgeoning relationship with Dexter-Jones.

Ronson, along with his mother, stepfather, and sisters, moved to New York City when he was eight years old. Living on the Upper West Side of Manhattan, he counted Sean Lennon among his childhood friends. At twelve, being a self-described music nerd, he pestered Rolling Stone founder Jann Wenner into an internship at the magazine. He attended high school at the private Collegiate School in Manhattan before attending Vassar College and then New York University. In 2008, he obtained American citizenship so that he could vote in that year's election.

Family 
He was born into the Ronson family, formerly one of Britain's wealthiest families and founders of Heron International; following success in the 1980s, they lost $1 billion of their wealth in the property crash of the early 1990s. He is the nephew of businessman Gerald Ronson.

Through his mother, he is distantly related to British Conservative politicians Sir Malcolm Rifkind and Leon Brittan, and Odeon Cinemas founder Oscar Deutsch.

Ronson has two younger sisters, twins Charlotte Ronson, a fashion designer, and Samantha Ronson, a singer and DJ. Through his mother's second marriage to Mick Jones he has two elder step-siblings and two half-siblings, including actress Annabelle Dexter-Jones. Through his father's second marriage, he has three other half-siblings.

Career
While attending New York University, Ronson became a regular in the downtown hip hop night life. He became known as a DJ on the New York club scene by 1993, charging $50 per job. He was known for his diverse, genre-spanning selection. He attracted a wide audience by fusing funk, hip hop, and rock and roll into his setlists, and playing songs that were popular in both the United States and the United Kingdom. He was soon popular and sought-after DJ in New York City, frequently booked for high-profile events and private parties. In 1999, Ronson was featured in an ad wearing Tommy Hilfiger denim in the recording studio for an ad campaign for the company.

2001–05: Here Comes the Fuzz and initial producing
Mark made the leap from DJ to producer after Nikka Costa's manager, Dominique Trenier, heard one of his sets and introduced the musicians. Ronson produced Costa's song "Everybody Got Their Something," and Ronson soon signed a record contract with Elektra Records. He had already produced tracks for Hilfiger ads and, in 2001, used the connection to have Costa's single "Like a Feather" used in an advertisement.

Ronson's debut album, Here Comes the Fuzz, was released in 2003. Despite poor initial sales, it was generally well received by critics. As well as writing the songs on the album, Ronson created the beats, played guitar, keyboards, and bass. The album featured performances from artists from diverse genres, including Mos Def, Jack White, Sean Paul, Nappy Roots and Rivers Cuomo. The lead single and best known song from the album, "Ooh Wee," samples "Sunny" by Boney M and features the rappers Nate Dogg, Ghostface Killah, Trife Da God, and Saigon. The song charted at number 15 on the UK Singles Chart and was used in a number of films, including in Honey (2003) and on its soundtrack. Two weeks after releasing Here Comes the Fuzz, Elektra Records dropped him.

In 2004, Ronson formed his own record label, Allido Records, a subsidiary of Sony BMG's J Records, along with his longtime manager Rich Kleiman. The first artist he signed to Allido was rapper Saigon, who later left to sign with Just Blaze's Fort Knox Entertainment. He has signed Rhymefest, most well known for winning the Grammy for co-writing Kanye West's "Jesus Walks."

2006–09: Version

On 2 April 2007, Ronson released a cover of The Smiths' track "Stop Me If You Think You've Heard This One Before" under the title "Stop Me", featuring singer Daniel Merriweather. It reached number 2 in the UK singles charts, giving Ronson his highest-peaking single until 2014's "Uptown Funk". Ronson remixed the Bob Dylan song "Most Likely You Go Your Way And I'll Go Mine" in promotion for the three-disc Bob Dylan set titled Dylan released October 2007. Ronson has also produced Candie Payne's "One More Chance (Ronson mix)" in 2007.

The album Version was well received by critics particularly in the UK and US. In May 2007 it was awarded the title Album of the Month by the British dance music magazine, Mixmag. On 23 June, Ronson made the cover of The Guardian newspaper's Guide magazine, alongside singer Lily Allen.

In June 2007, Ronson signed DC hip hop artist Wale to Allido Records. In late 2007, he focused on production, working with Daniel Merriweather on his debut album, and recording again with Amy Winehouse and Robbie Williams.

On 24 October 2007, Ronson performed a one-off set at The Roundhouse in Camden, London as part of the BBC Electric Proms 2007. The performance featured the BBC Concert Orchestra and included special guests Terry Hall, Sean Lennon, Tim Burgess, Alex Greenwald, Ricky Wilson, Charlie Waller, Adele and Kyle Falconer.

In December 2007, Ronson received his first Grammy Award nomination, for 'Producer of the Year, Non-Classical'. Ronson's work with Amy Winehouse also received substantial accolades, gaining 6 nominations. Winehouse's "Back to Black" album, mostly produced by Ronson, was nominated for 'Album of the Year' and 'Best Pop Vocal Album'. Her song "Rehab" received nods for 'Best Female Pop Vocal Performance', 'Song of the Year' and 'Record of the Year'. Ronson would go on to win three Grammys: 'Producer of the Year' as well as 'Best Pop Vocal Album' and 'Record of the Year' (the latter two of which he shared with Amy Winehouse) in early February 2008.

Ronson is credited as producer on a mixtape album called Man in the Mirror, released in January 2008 by the rapper Rhymefest which is a tribute to the pop star Michael Jackson. The album features Rhymefest appearing to speak to Michael Jackson using archive audio from interviews with the pop star. The same month Ronson received three nominations for the Brit Awards, including 'Best Male Solo Artist,' 'Best Album' (Version) and 'Song of the Year' ("Valerie"). Ronson won his first Brit for 'Best Male Solo Artist' in mid-February 2008 over favourite Mika. He also performed a medley of Coldplay's "God Put a Smile upon Your Face" with Adele, "Stop Me" with Daniel Merriweather, and "Valerie" with Amy Winehouse.

The performance allowed for a large boost in sales in the iTunes UK Top 100. "Valerie" would jump almost 30 spots in the days after the event, while "Just", "Stop Me" and "Oh My God" all appeared in the chart as well. That same week, Ronson appeared twice in the UK Top 40, with "Valerie" rebounding to number 13 and "Just" at number 31, his fourth Top 40 entry from "Version". The Brits performance also allowed for "Version" to climb 18 spots to number 4.

Around this time, Ronson received his first number one on an international chart (Dutch Top 40) for "Valerie," which spent four consecutive weeks at the top of the chart. He collaborated with Kaiser Chiefs on their third album.

Ronson toured the album "Version" extensively through both the UK and Europe during 2008. Notable sold-out performances at The Hammersmith Apollo and Brixton Academy. Ronson is known to champion new upcoming artists on the road with him, such as Sam Sparro and Julian Perretta. Ronson's string backing was provided by the all-female string quartet Demon Strings.

On 2 July 2008, in Paris, Mark Ronson performed live with Duran Duran for an invited audience. They played new arrangements by Ronson of some Duran Duran songs, along with tracks from the band's new album, Red Carpet Massacre. Ronson & the Version Players also performed songs from his album Version. Simon LeBon sang. As of March 2009, Ronson was working with the group on their 13th album. The Album, titled All You Need Is Now, was released digitally exclusively via Apple's iTunes on 21 December 2010, while the physical CD was released in March 2011 with additional tracks. In 2013–14 Ronson was once again in the studio producing Duran Duran's 14th album, Paper Gods, making it the first time the band has worked with the same producer on consecutive albums since Colin Thurston produced their first two albums in the 1980s.

2010–12: Record Collection
In the Spring of 2010, Ronson confirmed the name of his new album Record Collection, and said that he hoped to have it out by September 2010. Additionally, Ronson announced the name of his new band, "The Business Intl.'", which is the alias adopted by Ronson on the third studio album. The first single "Bang Bang Bang". which featured rapper Q-Tip and singer MNDR was released on 12 July 2010, where it peaked at number 6 on the UK Singles Chart, giving Ronson his fourth Top 10 single. The single also entered the Irish Singles Chart, where it peaked at number 18. The second single from the album, "The Bike Song", was released on 19 September 2010, and features Kyle Falconer from The View and Spank Rock. The album was released on 27 September 2010. This is the first Ronson album on which he features as a singer.

Although Ronson had never met Michael Jackson he was given the vocal track to a song titled "Lovely Way", sung by Michael Jackson, in 2010 to produce for Jackson's posthumous album Michael. He submitted the track, but it did not make the tracklisting for Michael. Ronson said about the rumours surrounding the vocals on the track (due to the controversy surrounding the Cascio tracks on that same album), "It was definitely him singing. I was given a vocal track to work with but I never actually met Michael. [...] It's in the vein of Elton John's 'Goodbye Yellow Brick Road' and John Lennon's 'Imagine'."

He provided the score for the 2011 film Arthur. Ronson was one of the artists featured in the 2012 documentary Re:GENERATION Music Project. His song "A La Modeliste" features Mos Def, Erykah Badu, Trombone Shorty, members of The Dap-Kings, and Zigaboo Modeliste.

2013–2017: Uptown Special and Amy
On 30 October 2014, Ronson announced, via Twitter, a new single from his upcoming album, to be released on 10 November 2014. The single, "Uptown Funk," features Bruno Mars on vocals. On 22 November 2014, Ronson and Mars appeared as the musical guest on Saturday Night Live performing "Uptown Funk" and "Feel Right" (featuring Mystikal). "Uptown Funk" reached number one in the UK and US singles charts, and also became the all-time most streamed track in a single week in the UK, having been streamed a record 2.49 million times in a week. "Uptown Funk" reached the top 10 in nearly every country it charted; it spent fifteen weeks at number one on the Canadian Hot 100, fourteen weeks at number one on the Billboard Hot 100, and seven weeks at number one on the UK Singles Chart. In February 2015 the song won Ronson the Brit Award for British Single of the Year. As of August 2022, the song's music video on YouTube has amassed over 4.6 billion views.

In 2015, Ronson starred in the documentary film Amy about his late friend Amy Winehouse. His voice features in the film where he talks about his career and relationship with Winehouse and there is footage of Ronson from the recording session of the single "Back to Black" from March 2006 and also at Winehouse's funeral in London in July 2011. On 16 October 2015, Ronson became a patron of the Amy Winehouse Foundation. In January 2016, Ronson was nominated for two Brit Awards; Best British Male Solo Artist, and British Producer of the Year, at the 2016 Brit Awards.

At the 2016 Grammy Awards Ronson won two awards for "Uptown Funk", including Record of the Year. Jason Iley, the head of Sony Music UK and Ronson's UK label Columbia Records, hailed Ronson as "a true gentleman" and "one of the most considerate, kind and humble artists in our industry." He added, "the monumental success of Uptown Funk is so thoroughly deserved and has established itself as, not only one of the Records of the Year but of our lifetime."

At the Super Bowl 50 Halftime Show Ronson performed "Uptown Funk" with Mars.

He went on to executive produce Lady Gaga's fifth album, Joanne.

Ronson produced the Queens of the Stone Age's 2017 album Villains.

2018–present: Silk City, "Shallow" and Late Night Feelings
In 2018, Ronson founded his own label, Zelig Records, an imprint of Columbia Records and the first artist he signed was singer King Princess. He also formed the duo Silk City with fellow producer Diplo. Their first single "Electricity" featuring Dua Lipa was released on 6 September and peaked at the US Dance Club Songs and received the Grammy Award for Best Dance Recording at the 61st Annual Grammy Awards.

In May 2018, it was revealed that Ronson was working with Miley Cyrus in the studio. Their first collaboration "Nothing Breaks Like a Heart" was released in November 2018. Ronson also co-wrote the song "Shallow" for the film A Star Is Born with his frequent collaborators Lady Gaga, Andrew Wyatt, and Anthony Rossomando. The song earned Ronson an Academy Award and the Golden Globe Award for Best Original Song, as well as two Grammy nominations, winning the Grammy Award for Best Song Written for Visual Media.

On 12 April 2019, it was announced that Mark Ronson would release his fifth album Late Night Feelings, on 26 June 2019. The album features Miley Cyrus, Angel Olsen, Lykke Li and Camila Cabello. Ronson has described the album as a collection of "sad bangers," with the title track laying down a warm mid-tempo dance groove under Li's melancholy vocals.

On 12 October 2019, BBC Two broadcast the documentary Mark Ronson: From the Heart, directed by Carl Hindmarch.

In June 2021, Ronson, along with the Foo Fighters, shared a "re-version" of their single "Making a Fire".

Personal life
Ronson divides his time between London, Los Angeles, and New York. Since childhood, he has been a fan of English Premier League football club Chelsea F.C. and is also a fan of the New York Knicks basketball team.

In 2009, Ronson was voted the most stylish man in the UK by GQ magazine.

In 2011, a portrait of Ronson was painted by British artist Joe Simpson; the painting was exhibited around the UK, including a solo exhibition at the Royal Albert Hall in London.

In 2015 he was named one of the magazine's 50 best dressed British men.

On 20 August 2019, Ronson, along with several other celebrities, invested in a funding round for Lowell Herb Co, a California cannabis brand. He is known to be "a dedicated cannabis consumer".

Relationships
In 2002, Ronson began dating the actress-singer Rashida Jones. They became engaged in March 2003, with Ronson proposing by creating a crossword puzzle with the message "Will you marry me." Their relationship ended approximately one year later.

On 3 September 2011, Ronson married French actress and singer Joséphine de La Baume, who had previously appeared in the music video for "The Bike Song". On 16 May 2017, it was reported that de La Baume had filed for divorce from Ronson, listing the separation date as 21 April 2017. The divorce was finalized in October 2018. On 4 September 2021, Ronson announced his marriage to actress Grace Gummer, after a year of dating. On 13 October 2022, Gummer and Ronson announced they are expecting their first child.

Lawsuit 
In 2017, Lastrada Entertainment claimed that "Uptown Funk" infringed the copyright of Zapp & Roger's 1980 hit song "More Bounce to the Ounce". A total of three lawsuits had been filed by different parties.

Discography

 Here Comes the Fuzz (2003)
 Version (2007)
 Record Collection (with The Business Intl.) (2010)
 Uptown Special (2015)
 Late Night Feelings (2019)

Filmography
Zoolander (2001) – Himself
Amy (2015) – Himself
Gaga: Five Foot Two (2017) – Himself
Spies in Disguise (2019) – Agency Control Room Technician (cameo)

Videos
Ronson created a video, along with directors Gary Breslin and Jordan Galland, called Circuit Breaker, which was an homage to the video game The Legend of Zelda: A Link to the Past. In 2001, Ronson appeared in the Aaliyah music video "More Than a Woman" as a DJ. On 30 July 2021, the documentary series Watch the Sound with Mark Ronson was released on Apple TV+.

Production discography
Adapted from AllMusic. Bold denotes a commercial single.

Other singles 
1997: Posse-O – "It's Up to You..."*
1998: Powerule – "Heatin' Up"*
1998: Powerule – "Rhymes to Bust" / "It's Your Right"*
2002: J-Live – "School's In"*
2004: Daniel Merriweather – "City Rules"*
2004: Daniel Merriweather – "She's Got Me"*
2005: Rhymefest – "These Days"*
2005: Rhymefest – "Brand New"*
2007: Candie Payne – "One More Chance"*
2007: Bob Dylan – "Most Likely You Go Your Way (And I'll Go Mine) (Mark Ronson Re-version)"*
2007: Maroon 5 featuring Mary J. Blige – "Wake Up Call (Mark Ronson Remix)"*
2008: Leon Jean-Marie – "Bed of Nails"*
2008: Kaiser Chiefs – "Never Miss a Beat"*
2008: Wiley – "Cash in My Pocket"*
2008: Kaiser Chiefs – "Good Days Bad Days"*
2009: Daniel Merriweather – "Change"*
2009: Daniel Merriweather – "Red"*
2009: Daniel Merriweather – "Impossible"
2012: Rufus Wainwright – "Out of the Game"*
2012: Rufus Wainwright – "Jericho"*
2013: Giggs – "(Is It Gangsta?) Yes Yes Yes"*
2015: Duran Duran featuring Janelle Monáe and Nile Rodgers – "Pressure Off"*
2016: Various Artists – "Hands"*
2018: Michael Jackson - "Diamonds Are Invincible"* (Mash-Up)
2018: Silk City - "Electricity"* featuring Dua Lipa, Diplo and Mark Ronson
2018: Lady Gaga and Bradley Cooper – "Shallow"*
2020: Troye Sivan featuring Kacey Musgraves and Mark Ronson - "Easy"*

Awards and nominations

References

External links
 
 
 
 
 Mark Ronson and Boy George

1975 births
20th-century English musicians
21st-century English musicians
Allido Records artists
APRA Award winners
British Ashkenazi Jews
Best Original Song Academy Award-winning songwriters
Brit Award winners
British alternative rock musicians
British hip hop DJs
Collegiate School (New York) alumni
Columbia Records artists
DJs from London
Elektra Records artists
English emigrants to the United States
English people of Austrian-Jewish descent
English people of Lithuanian-Jewish descent
English people of Russian-Jewish descent
English multi-instrumentalists
English record producers
English songwriters
Golden Globe Award-winning musicians
Grammy Award winners
Hip hop record producers
J Records artists
Jewish English musicians
Jewish hip hop record producers
Jewish singers
Living people
People from Notting Hill
People from the Upper West Side
RCA Records artists
M
Mark Ronson
Silk City (duo) members
Sony Music UK artists
The Flip Squad members
Tisch School of the Arts alumni